"In My Eyes" is a song written and recorded by American country music artist Lionel Cartwright.  It was released in October 1989 as the fourth and final single from his self-titled album.  The song reached number twelve on the Billboard Hot Country Singles & Tracks chart. Before its release as a single, it was the B-side to Cartwright's debut single "You're Gonna Make Her Mine".

Zona Jones covered the song on his 2004 album Harleys & Horses.

Chart performance
"In My Eyes" debuted on the U.S. Billboard Hot Country Singles & Tracks for the week of October 14, 1989.

Year-end charts

References

1989 singles
Lionel Cartwright songs
Song recordings produced by Tony Brown (record producer)
Songs written by Lionel Cartwright
MCA Nashville Records singles
1989 songs